The Malavsky family was a Jewish-American family who appeared throughout the Jewish world in concerts of cantorial and Jewish folk music. The father of the family, Samuel Malavsky (1894–1985), a renowned cantor and composer, was often the soloist, accompanied by his four daughters and two sons.

Samuel Malavsky
Cantor Samuel (Shmuel) Malavsky was born in the Ukrainian city of Smila, near Kiev in 1894. In 1914, at the age of 20, he emigrated to America. His talent as a cantor was recognized by the world-renowned hazzan (cantor) Yossele Rosenblatt (who was also from the Ukraine), who adopted Malavsky as his protégé. Malavsky was a cantor in numerous orthodox communities, including Bridgeton, Brooklyn, Philadelphia, New Haven and Detroit. He recorded many solo cantorial recordings, accompanied by an organ, as well as duets with his mentor Yossele Rosenblatt. His voice was expansive, warm, expressive and emotional.  He was a talented composer of cantorial melodies and a gifted improviser. Many of his compositions have become classics of the cantorial genre.

Malavsky family choir
When his children grew up and his sons returned from army service during World War II, Cantor Malavsky decided to appear together with his family, creating a choir from his two sons - Avraham (Albert) and Morton - and his four daughters - Goldie (Gloria), Gittele (Trudie), Ruth and Menucha (Minnie); the latter became known as the Four Chazentes. This was a bold step for a cantor who declared himself to be Orthodox, since the idea of a woman cantor was considered counter to halacha. The Orthodox synagogues refused to allow Malavsky to appear together with his daughters. On the other hand, Malavsky refused to accept a cantorial appointment in a Conservative synagogue, finding the changes to update the liturgy unacceptable. Instead, the Malavsky family appeared in rented halls and hotels. The first appeared in San Francisco in 1945, and later throughout the United States, performing cantorial music, Jewish and jazz songs both in Hebrew and in Yiddish.

Goldele (Goldie) Malavsky established her own independent career as a singer, appearing both as soloist as well in duets with her sister Gittele. Goldie became well known as a chazante, even though she never appeared in the formal role of a cantor in a synagogue service. Goldie and Gittile later formed the Marlin Sisters, recording 45 records, collaborating with Guy Mitchell, Eddie Fisher and Ted Steele. The Malavsky family performed abroad as well, appearing in Canada, France, England, Cuba and Israel. When they appeared in the Edison theater in Jerusalem, they were billed as "the greatest musical sensation in the U.S. on stage, radio, television and records." They grossed $187,000 in 35 concerts and donated the proceeds to Israel. One of their melodies - "Haben Yakir Li Efraim" - has become a classic of Israeli music, as a result of the performance by Miri Aloni and the Nahal entertainment troupe.

See also

 Religious Jewish music
 chazzan
 chazante

References

 http://hazzanut.org/samuel-malavsky/

External links
 Many recordings by the Malavsky family have been collected by the Judaica Sound Archive of Florida Atlantic University.

American musical families
Jewish-American families
Jewish musical groups
Yiddish-language singers
American folk musical groups
American people of Ukrainian-Jewish descent